

History

Declaration of independence 
In November 1990, Dzhokhar Dudayev was elected head of the Executive Committee of the unofficial opposition Chechen National Congress (NCChP), which advocated sovereignty for Chechnya as a separate republic within the Soviet Union.

On 8 June 1991, at the initiative of Dzhokhar Dudayev, a part of the delegates of the First Chechen National Congress gathered in Grozny, which proclaimed itself the All-National Congress of the Chechen People (OKChN). Following this, was proclaimed the Chechen Republic (Nokhchi-cho). A month later, the self-proclaimed republic was declared an independent state.

The Soviet coup d'état attempt on 19 August 1991 became the spark for the so-called Chechen Revolution. On 21 August, the OKChN called for the overthrow of the Supreme Soviet of the Chechen-Ingush ASSR. On 6 September 1991, OKChN squads seized the local KGB headquarters, and took over the building of the Supreme Soviet. The OKChN declared itself the only legitimate authority in the region. On 27 October 1991, Dudayev was elected president of the Chechen Republic. Dudayev, in his new position as president, issued a unilateral declaration of independence on 1 November 1991. Initially, his stated objective was for Checheno-Ingushetia to become a union republic within Russia.

The separatist Interior Minister promised amnesty to any prison inmates who would join pro-independence rallies. Among the prisoners was Ruslan Labazanov, who was serving a sentence for armed robbery and murder in Grozny and later headed a pro-Dudayev militia. As crowds of armed separatists gathered in Grozny, Russian President Boris Yeltsin sought to declare a state of emergency in the region, but his efforts were thwarted by the Russian parliament. An early attempt by Russian authorities to confront the pro-independence forces in November 1991 ended after just three days.

According to an article originally published by a Kremlin-backed publication, Komsomolskaya Pravda, and reprinted in early 1992 by The Guardian, Dudayev allegedly signed a decree outlawing the extradition of criminals to any country which did not recognize Chechnya. After being informed that the Russian government would not recognize Chechnya's independence, he declared that he would not recognize Russia. Grozny became an organized crime haven, as the government proved unable or unwilling to curb criminal activities.

Dudayev's government created the constitution of the Chechen Republic, which was introduced in March 1992. In the same month, armed clashes occurred between pro and anti-Dudayev factions, leading Dudayev to declare a state of emergency. Chechnya and Ingushetia separated on 4 June 1992. Relationship between Dudayev and the parliament deteriorated, and in June 1992 he dissolved the parliament, establishing direct presidential rule.

In late October 1992, federal forces were dispatched to end the Ossetian-Ingush conflict. As Russian troops sealed the border between Chechnya and Ingushetia to prevent arms shipments, Dudayev threatened to take action unless the Russians withdrew. Russian and Chechen forces mutually agreed to a withdrawal, and the incident ended peacefully.

Clashes between supporters and opponents of Dudayev occurred in April 1993. The President fired Interior Minister Sharpudin Larsanov after he refused to disperse the protesters. The opposition planned a no-confidence referendum against Dudayev for 5 June 1993. The government deployed army and riot police to prevent the vote from taking place, leading to bloodshed.

After staging another coup attempt in December 1993, the opposition organized a Provisional Council as a potential alternative government for Chechnya, calling on Moscow for assistance.

On 14 January 1994, by Dudayev's decree, the Chechen Republic (Nokhchi-cho) was renamed the Chechen Republic of Ichkeria.

First war 

The general feeling of lawlessness in Chechnya increased during the first seven months in 1994, when four hijacking accidents occurred, involving people trying to flee the country. In May 1994, Labazanov changed sides, establishing the anti-Dudayev Niyso Movement. In July 1994, 41 passengers aboard a bus near Mineralniye Vody were held by kidnappers demanding $15 million and helicopters. After this incident, the Russian government started to openly support opposition forces in Chechnya.

In August 1994, Umar Avturkhanov, leader of the pro-Russian Provisional Council, launched an attack against pro-Dudayev forces. Dudayev ordered the mobilization of the Chechen military, threatening a jihad against Russia as a response to Russian support for his political opponents.

In November 1994, Avturkhanov's forces attempted to storm the city of Grozny, but they were defeated by Dudayev's forces. Dudayev declared his intention to turn Chechnya into an Islamic state, stating that the recognition of sharia was a way to fight Russian aggression. He also vowed to punish the captured Chechen rebels under Islamic law, and threatened to execute Russian prisoners.

The First Chechen War began in December 1994, when Russian troops were sent to Chechnya to fight the separatist forces. During the Battle of Grozny (1994–95), the city's population dropped from 400,000 to 140,000. Most of the civilians stranded in the city were elderly ethnic Russians, as many Chechens had support networks of relatives living in villages who took them in.

Former Minister of the Chemical and Oil Refining Industry of the USSR Salambek Khadzhiyev was appointed leader of the officially recognized Chechen government in November 1994. The conflict ended after the Russian defeat in the Battle of Grozny of August 1996.

Interwar period (1996–1999) 
According to Russian sources, after the Russian withdrawal, crime became rampant, with kidnappings and murders multiplying as rival rebel factions fought for territory. In December 1996, six Red Cross workers were killed, resulting in most foreign aid workers leaving the country.

Parliamentary and presidential elections took place in January 1997 in Chechnya and brought to power Aslan Maskhadov. The elections were deemed free and fair, but no government recognized Chechnya's independence, except for the Islamic Emirate of Afghanistan. According to a 1997 Moscow Times article, ethnic Russian refugees were prevented from returning to vote by threats and intimidation, and Chechen authorities refused to set up polling booths outside the republic.

Maskhadov sought to maintain Chechen sovereignty while pressing Moscow to help rebuild the republic, whose formal economy and infrastructure were virtually destroyed in Russia's war against Chechen independence from Moscow.

In May 1997, the Russia–Chechen Peace Treaty was signed by Maskhadov and Yeltsin. Russia continued to transfer funds for schools and hospitals in Chechnya and paid pensions to its residents. Some of this money was stolen by the Chechen authorities and divided between the warlords. Nearly half a million people (40% of Chechnya's prewar population) have been internally displaced and lived in refugee camps or overcrowded villages. The economy was destroyed. Two Russian brigades were stationed in Chechnya and did not leave. Maskhadov made efforts to rebuild the country and its devastated capital Grozny by trading oil in countries such as the United Kingdom.

Chechnya had been badly damaged by Russia's war against the newly formed republic's independence, and the economy was in shambles. According to Russian sources, Aslan Maskhadov tried to concentrate power in his hands to establish authority, but had trouble creating an effective state or a functioning economy. Maskhadov requested $260 billion in war reparations from Russia to rebuild infrastructure destroyed in heavy Russian fighting, an amount equivalent to 60% of the Russian GDP.

The war ravages and lack of economic opportunities left numbers of armed former guerrillas with no occupation. Machine guns and grenades were sold openly and legally in Grozny's central bazaar. The years of independence had some political violence as well. On 10 December 1998, Mansur Tagirov, Chechnya's top prosecutor, disappeared while returning to Grozny. On 21 June, the Chechen security chief and a guerrilla commander fatally shot each other in an argument. The internal violence in Chechnya peaked on 16 July 1998, when fighting broke out between Maskhadov's National Guard force led by Sulim Yamadayev (who joined pro-Moscow forces in the second war) and militants in the town of Gudermes; over 50 people were reported killed and the state of emergency was declared in Chechnya.

Maskhadov proved unable to guarantee the security of the oil pipeline running across Chechnya from the Caspian Sea, and illegal oil tapping and acts of sabotage deprived his regime of crucial revenues and agitated his allies in Moscow. In 1998 and 1999, Maskhadov survived several assassination attempts, which he blamed on foreign intelligence services. Russian sources maintain that the attacks were likely to originate from within Chechnya, despite the Kremlin's difficult negotiations with Maskhadov and difference of opinion regarding the Chechen conflict.

In December 1998, the Supreme Islamic court of Chechnya suspended the Chechen Parliament, asserting that it did not conform to the standards of sharia. After Vakha Arsanov, the Chechen Vice-President, defected to the opposition, Maskhadov abolished his post, leading to a power struggle. In February 1999 President Maskhadov removed legislative powers from the parliament and convened an Islamic State Council. At the same time several prominent former warlords established the Mehk-Shura, a rival Islamic government. The Shura advocated the creation of an Islamic confederation in the North Caucasus, including the Chechen, Dagestani and Ingush peoples.

Second war and insurgency period

On 9 August 1999, Islamist fighters from Chechnya infiltrated Russia's Dagestan region, declaring it an independent state and calling for a jihad until "all unbelievers had been driven out". This event prompted Russian intervention, and the beginning of the Second Chechen War. As more people escaped the war zones of Chechnya, President Maskhadov threatened to impose Sharia punishment on all civil servants who moved their families out of the republic. This time, however, the Russian invasion met much less resistance as during the First Chechen War. The infighting among the rival factions within Chechyna as well as the rise of radical jihadists convinced several former separatist leaders and their militias to switch sides. Aided by these defectors, the Russians took the minor cities and countryside around Grozny in the period from October to December 1999, encircling Grozny.

After a hard-fought battle, Grozny fell in February 2000; much of the city was destroyed. Some of the Ichkerian government subsequently moved into exile, including in Poland and the United Kingdom. On 23 January 2000, a diplomatic representation of Ichkeria was based in Kabul during the Taliban regime in Afghanistan. Other remnants of the government and the armed forces retreated into Chechyna's south which was dominated by mountains and not yet under Russian control. From these bases, they waged a guerrilla campaign, even as Russia cemented its control by establishing a loyal administration in the region. In June 2000, Kremlin appointee Akhmed Kadyrov became the new controversial head of the official administration of Chechnya. Kadyrov, who has been criticised as the object of a cult of personality, was not democratically elected by either Russian or Chechen constituents. The separatists continued to fight, but were gradually whittled down.

On 31 October 2007, the separatist news agency Chechenpress reported that Dokka Umarov had announced the Caucasus Emirate and declared himself its Emir. He integrated the Chechen Republic of Ichkeria as Vilayat Nokhchicho. This change of status was rejected by some Chechen politicians and military leaders who continue to support the existence of the republic. Since November 2007, Akhmed Zakayev was proclaimed to be the Prime Minister of Ichkeria's government-in-exile. However, the influence of Zakayev's government was described as "marginal" by political scientist Mark Galeotti who argued that the Caucasus Emirate proved more influential both among the militants as well as within the Chechen diaspora.

From 2007 until 2017, the remaining insurgency in the North Caucasus was mainly waged by Islamist factions, most importantly the Caucasus Emirate. In course of several years; however, the Caucasus Emirate gradually declined and had mostly ceased to exist by 2015. Other Chechen groups continued to operate in Ukraine where they fought against Russia in the War in Donbas. The early pro-Ukrainian Chechen volunteer units included the Dzhokhar Dudayev Battalion and Sheikh Mansur Battalion.

Russo-Ukrainian War

In 2022, Russia launched a full invasion of Ukraine. Anti-Kadyrov Chechens like the Dzhokhar Dudayev Battalion and Sheikh Mansur Battalion continued to fight in this conflict. In May 2022, Ichkeria's government-in-exile leader Akhmed Zakayev travelled to Kyiv and met with Ukrainian officials for "confidential" talks. Later, the creation of the "Separate Special Purpose Battalion of the Chechen Republic's Armed Forces" was announced by Zakayev; this unit officially styled itself as continuation of Armed Forces of the Chechen Republic of Ichkeria. A fourth separatist unit, called "Khamzat Gelayev Joint Task Detachment" was also founded. As the Russo-Ukrainian War continued to escalate, the pro-Ukrainian Chechen separatists increasingly framed the war as a chance to restore the Chechen Republic of Ichkeria. On 18 October 2022, Ukraine's parliament recognized the Chechen Republic of Ichkeria as temporarily occupied state. At this point, Islamist separatists belonging to Ajnad al-Kavkaz had also moved to Ukraine to fight Russia there. In November, the Ichkerian exile government recognized the Holodomor as a genocide against the Ukrainian people.

Military 

Dudayev spent the years from 1991 to 1994 preparing for war, mobilizing men aged 15–55 and seizing Russian weapons depots. The Chechen National Guard counted 10,000 troops in December 1994, rising to 40,000 soldiers by early 1996.

Major weapons systems were seized from the Russian military in 1992, and on the eve of the First Chechen War they included 23 air defense guns, 108 APC/tanks, 24 artillery pieces, 5 MiG-17/15, 2 Mi-8 helicopters, 24 multiple rocket launchers, 17 surface to air missile launchers, 94 L-29 trainer aircraft, 52 L-39 trainer aircraft, 6 An-22 transport aircraft, 5 Tu-134 transport aircraft.

Politics 

Since the declaration of independence in 1991, there has been an ongoing battle between secessionist officials and federally appointed officials. Both claim authority over the same territory.

In late 2007, the President of Ichkeria, Dokka Umarov, declared that he had renamed the republic to Noxçiyc̈ó and converted it into a province of the much larger Caucasus Emirate, with himself as Emir. This change was rejected by some members of the former Chechen government-in-exile.

The Chechen Republic of Ichkeria was officially a secular state, with its constitution stating, "The Chechen Republic is a secular state. No religion may be established as a state or compulsory religion." Despite this, the criminal code of Chechnya legally established Sharia courts and included Islamic hudud punishments of decapitation, stoning and other punishments for crimes such as alcohol drinking, sodomy, and apostasy from Islam.

Foreign relations
Ichkeria was a member of the Unrepresented Nations and Peoples Organization. Former president of Georgia, Zviad Gamsakhurdia, deposed in a military coup of 1991 and a leading participant in the Georgian Civil War, recognised the independence of the Chechen Republic of Ichkeria in 1993.

Diplomatic relations with Ichkeria were also established by the partially recognized Islamic Emirate of Afghanistan under the Taliban government on 16 January 2000. This recognition ceased with the fall of the Taliban in December 2001. However, despite Taliban recognition, there were no friendly relations between the Taliban and Ichkeria—Maskhadov rejected their recognition, stating that the Taliban were illegitimate. In June 2000, the Russian government claimed that Maskhadov had met with Osama bin Laden, and that the Taliban supported the Chechens with arms and troops. In the aftermath of the September 11 attacks, the Bush administration called on Maskhadov to cut all links with the Taliban.

Ichkeria also received limited support from certain political factions in Poland, the Baltic countries and Ukrainian nationalists. Estonia once voted to recognize, but the act never was consummated due to pressure from both Russia and pro-Russian elements within the European Union. Dudayev also had contacts with Islamist movements and guerrillas in the United Arab Emirates, Afghanistan and Saudi Arabia.

During the 2022 Russian invasion of Ukraine, the Verkhovna Rada passed a resolution in October recognizing the Chechen Republic of Ichkeria as "temporarily occupied" by Russia.

Human rights

First Chechen War
The human rights situation in Chechnya during the hostility phases had long been a concern among several human rights organisations such as Human Rights Watch, who, after several years of investigation and gathering evidence, referred to the situation as disturbing. Throughout the span of the first Chechen war, Russian forces have been accused by Human Rights organizations of starting a brutal war with total disregard for humanitarian law, causing tens of thousands of unnecessary civilian casualties among the Chechen population. The main strategy in the Russian war effort had been to use heavy artillery and air strikes leading to numerous indiscriminate attacks on civilians. This has led to Western and Chechen sources calling the Russian strategy deliberate terror bombing on parts of Russia. According to Human Rights Watch, the campaign was "unparalleled in the area since World War II for its scope and destructiveness, followed by months of indiscriminate and targeted fire against civilians". Russian forces attacked civilians many times throughout the war. One of the most notable war crimes committed by the Russian army during the First Chechen War is the Samashki massacre, in which it is estimated that up to 300 civilians died during the attack. Russian forces conducted an operation of zachistka, house-by-house searches throughout the entire village. Federal soldiers deliberately and arbitrarily attacked civilians and civilian dwellings in Samashki by shooting residents and burning houses with flame-throwers. They wantonly opened fire or threw grenades into basements where residents, mostly women, elderly persons and children, had been hiding. Russian troops intentionally burned many bodies, either by throwing the bodies into burning houses or by setting them on fire. A Chechen surgeon, Khassan Baiev, treated wounded in Samashki immediately after the operation and described the scene in his book:

Dozens of charred corpses of women and children lay in the courtyard of the mosque, which had been destroyed. The first thing my eye fell on was the burned body of a baby, lying in fetal position... A wild-eyed woman emerged from a burned-out house holding a dead baby. Trucks with bodies piled in the back rolled through the streets on the way to the cemetery.

While treating the wounded, I heard stories of young men - gagged and trussed up - dragged with chains behind personnel carriers. I heard of Russian aviators who threw Chechen prisoners, screaming, out their helicopters. There were rapes, but it was hard to know how many because women were too ashamed to report them. One girl was raped in front of her father. I heard of one case in which the mercenary grabbed a newborn baby, threw it among each other like a ball, then shot it dead in the air.

Leaving the village for the hospital in Grozny, I passed a Russian armored personnel carrier with the word SAMASHKI written on its side in bold, black letters. I looked in my rearview mirror and to my horror saw a human skull mounted on the front of the vehicle. The bones were white; someone must have boiled the skull to remove the flesh.

Chechen forces have admitted to the execution of captured Russian pilots throughout the First Chechen War, and of at least eight Russian detainees. In probably the most notorious violation of humanitarian law by committed by Chechen Forces, a Chechen unit led by Shamil Basayev captured a hospital and held it as hostage in the Russian city of Budyonnovsk. At least seven hostages were killed by the captors, and the rest were denied water, food and medicine. According to official figures, 129 civilians were killed during the siege, most by the numerous attempts of the Russian army to retake the hospital. The United Nations Commission on Human Rights had this to report on the incident:
Although the conduct of Chechen fighters has scarcely been documented in non-governmental reports, information indicates that they indiscriminately fired on, and killed, civilians. For example, on 14 June 1995, Chechen commandos took some 2,000 people hostage in the town of Budennovsk in the Stavropol region and barricaded themselves in the town's hospital. The hostage-takers allegedly shot to death in the hospital four civilian men. In this incident, over 100 hostages were reportedly killed when Federal forces attempted to take over the hospital.

Interwar period 
Kidnappings, robberies, and killings of fellow Chechens and outsiders weakened the possibilities of outside investment and Maskhadov's efforts to gain international recognition of its independence effort. Kidnappings became common in Chechnya, procuring over $200 million during the three year independence of the chaotic fledgling state, but victims were rarely killed. In a Los Angeles Times interview with a Russian woman, she states that kidnappers would at times mutilate their captives and send video recordings to their families, to encourage the payment of ransoms. According to her there was a slave market in Minutka Square, downtown Grozny. Some of the kidnapped were supposedly sold into indentured servitude to Chechen families. They were openly called slaves and had to endure starvation, beating, and often maiming according to Russian sources. In 1998, 176 people had been kidnapped, and 90 of them had been released during the same year according to official accounts. There were several public executions of criminals.

After the First Chechen War, the country won de facto independence from Russia, and Islamic courts were established. In September 1996, a Sharia-based criminal code was adopted, which included provisions for banning alcohol and punishing adultery with death by stoning. Sharia was supposed to apply to Muslims only, but in fact it was also applied to ethnic Russians who violated Sharia provisions. In one of the first rulings under sharia law, in January 1997 an Islamic court ordered the payment of blood money to the family of a man who was killed in a traffic accident. In November 1997, the Islamic dress code was imposed on all female students and civil servants in the country. In December 1997, the Supreme Sharia Court banned New Year celebrations, considering them "an act of apostasy and falsity". Conceding to an armed and vocal minority movement in the opposition led by Movladi Udugov, in February 1999, Maskhadov declared The Islamic Republic of Ichkeria, and the Sharia system of justice was introduced. Maskhadov hoped that this would discredit the opposition, putting stability before his own ideological affinities. However, according to former Foreign Minister Ilyas Akhmadov, the public primarily supported Maskhadov, his Independence Party, and their secularism. This was exemplified by the much greater numbers in political rallies supporting the government than those supporting the Islamist opposition. Akhmadov notes that the parliament, which was dominated by Maskhadov's own Independence Party, issued a public statement that President Maskhadov did not have the constitutional authority to proclaim sharia law, and also condemning the opposition for "undermining the foundations of the state".

In 1998, four western engineers working for Granger Telecom were abducted and beheaded after a failed rescue attempt. Gennady Shpigun, the Interior Ministry liaison to Chechen officials, was kidnapped in March 1999 as he was leaving Grozny Airport; his remains were found in Chechnya in March 2000. President Maskhadov started a major campaign against hostage-takers, and on 25 October 1998, Shadid Bargishev, Chechnya's top anti-kidnapping official, was killed in a remote controlled car bombing. Bargishev's colleagues then insisted they would not be intimidated by the attack and would go ahead with their offensive. Other anti-kidnapping officials blamed the attack on Bargishev's recent success in securing the release of several hostages, including 24 Russian soldiers and an English couple. Maskhadov blamed the rash of abductions in Chechnya on unidentified "outside forces" and their Chechen henchmen, allegedly those who joined Pro-Moscow forces during the second war.

According to the Chechen government at least part of the kidnappings were orchestrated by the Federal Security Service, which was behind the kidnappings and financed them.

Second Chechen War
The Second Chechen War saw a new wave of war crimes and violation of International humanitarian law. Both sides have been criticised by international organizations of violating the Geneva Conventions. Russian forces have since the beginning of the conflict indiscriminately and disproportionately bombed and shelled civilian objects, resulting in heavy civilian casualties. In October 1999, powerful ballistic missiles were fired on the Grozny central market, resulting in hundreds of casualties. Russian forces have throughout the campaign ignored to follow their Geneva convention obligations, and has taken little responsibility of protecting the civilian population. Russian media reports states that Russian soldiers were sometimes sold into slavery by their commanders. According to Amnesty International, Chechen civilians have been purposely targeted by Russian forces, in apparent disregard of humanitarian law. The situation has been described by Amnesty International as a Russian campaign to punish an entire ethnic group, on the pretext of "fighting crime and terrorism". In one such occasion, banned Thermobaric weapons were fired on the village of Katyr-Yurt, in what is known as the bombing of Katyr-Yurt. Hundreds of civilians died as a result of the Russian bombardment and the following sweep after. Thermobaric weapons have been used by the Russian army on several occasions according to Human Rights Watch. In what is regarded as one of gravest war crimes in the war, Russian federal forces went on a village-sweep (zachistka), summarily executing dozens of people and committing crimes in what is known as the Novye Aldi massacre.

During the Second Chechen War, Chechens and Chechen-led militants have at several occasions used terrorism against civilian targets. In one such occasion, three suicide bombers ran a truck filled with explosives into the Grozny governmental headquarters, resulting in at least 35 deaths. Chechen fighters have shown little regard for the safety of the civilian population, often placing their military positions in densely populated areas and refusing to leave civilian areas. Two large scale hostage-takings have been documented, the Moscow theater hostage crisis and Beslan school siege, resulting in the deaths of multiple civilians. In the Moscow stand-off, FSB Spetsnaz forces stormed the building on the third day using an unknown incapacitating chemical agent that proved to be lethal without sufficient medical care, resulting in deaths of 133 out of 916 hostages. In Beslan, some 20 hostages had been executed by their captors before the assault, and the ill-prepared assault itself resulted in 294 more casualties. A report by Human Rights Watch states that without minimizing the abuses committed by Chechen fighters, the main reason for civilian suffering in the Second Chechen War came as a result of the abuses committed by the Russian forces on the civilian population.

Minorities
Ethnic Russians made up 29% of the Chechen population before the war, and they generally opposed independence. Due to the mounting anti-Russian sentiment following the declaration of independence and the fear of an upcoming war, by 1994 over 200,000 ethnic Russians decided to leave the independence-striving republic. Ethnic Russians left behind faced constant harassment and violence. The separatist government acknowledged the violence, but did nothing to address it, blaming it on Russian provocateurs. Russians became a soft target for criminals, as they knew the Chechen police would not intervene in their defence. The start of the First Chechen War in 1994 and the first bombing of Grozny created a second wave of ethnic Russian refugees. By the end of the conflict in 1996, the Russian community had nearly vanished.

International recognition

UN member states

Former recognition

See also 
Russia–Chechnya Peace Treaty
Ukrainian recognition of the Chechen Republic of Ichkeria
History of Chechnya
Secession in Russia

Notes

References

Works cited

External links 
 Official website of the Chechen Republic of Ichkeria, archived June 2000

 
Chechen nationalism
History of Chechnya
Post-Soviet states
Separatism in Russia
States and territories established in 1991
States and territories disestablished in 2000
1991 establishments in Russia
2000 disestablishments in Russia
Former countries in Europe
Former republics
Former unrecognized countries
Governments in exile
Members of the Unrepresented Nations and Peoples Organization
Islamic republics